Toxopsoides is a genus of South Pacific araneomorph spiders in the family Toxopidae, and was first described by Raymond Robert Forster & C. L. Wilton in 1973. Originally placed with the intertidal spiders, it was moved to the Toxopidae in 2017.

Species
 it contains four species:
Toxopsoides erici Smith, 2013 – Australia (Queensland, New South Wales)
Toxopsoides huttoni Forster & Wilton, 1973 (type) – Southeastern Australia, New Zealand
Toxopsoides kathleenae Smith, 2013 – Australia (New South Wales)
Toxopsoides macleayi Smith, 2013 – Australia (New South Wales)

References

Araneomorphae genera
Spiders of Australia
Spiders of New Zealand
Taxa named by Raymond Robert Forster
Toxopidae